Kallur is a village in Chittoor district of the Indian state of Andhra Pradesh. It is located in Pulicherla mandal.

References 

Villages in Chittoor district

present on Chittoor Hyderabad highway